The United Kingdom of Great Britain and Northern Ireland  competed at the 2018 Winter Paralympics in Pyeongchang, South Korea, from 9 to 18 March 2018. They were known by the shortened name of Great Britain, for identification purposes.

Medallists

Medal and performance targets
UK Sport announced "an ambition of at least 7 medals which if achieved would mark the best performance in 30 years, and best since National Lottery funding came on stream in 1997".

Competitors
 
Great Britain sent a total of 17 athletes to the games. This was the most sent by the British team since 2006.

 Scott Meenagh was selected to compete in both the biathlon and cross-country skiing competitions.

Alpine skiing

Women

Men

Biathlon

Men

Cross-country skiing

Men

Snowboarding

Slalom

Snowboard cross

Wheelchair curling

Summary

Round Robin
Standings

Results
Great Britain had a bye in draws 2, 4, 6, 9, 14 and 16.

Draw 1
Saturday, 10 March, 14:35

Draw 3
Sunday, 11 March, 9:35

Draw 5
Sunday, 11 March, 19:35

Draw 7
Monday, 12 March, 14:35

Draw 8
Monday, 12 March, 19:35

Draw 10
Tuesday, 13 March, 14:35

Draw 11
Tuesday, 13 March, 19:35

Draw 12
Wednesday, 14 March, 9:35

Draw 13
Wednesday, 14 March, 14:35

Draw 15
Thursday, 15 March, 9:35

Draw 17
Thursday, 15 March, 19:35

See also
 Great Britain at the 2018 Winter Olympics

References

External links
International Paralympic Committee official website
Paralympics GB website

Nations at the 2018 Winter Paralympics
2018
Paralympics
Winter sports in the United Kingdom